Andy West (born February 6, 1953) is an American bass guitarist and composer who is an original founding member of the Dixie Dregs along with Steve Morse. Since the breakup of the original band in 1983, West has been on albums with Mike Keneally, Henry Kaiser, Paul Barrere, Vinnie Moore, and many others. His frequent style of playing bass is with a guitar pick, although he has performed in fingerstyle on several occasions. Since 1985, West has simultaneously pursued a career in the software industry while continuing to release albums sporadically. He currently works as a vice president for Analytics and Adaptive Learning at Pearson Education.

Discography

With Dixie Dregs
1976 The Great Spectacular (Formally released in 1997)
1977 Free Fall - Capricorn Records
1978 What If - Capricorn Records
1979 Night of the Living Dregs - Capricorn Records
1980 Dregs of the Earth - Arista Records
1981 Unsung Heroes - Arista Records
1982 Industry Standard - Arista Records
1988 Off the Record1989 Divided We Stand1997 King Biscuit Flower Hour Presents - The Dregs 1979 - King Biscuit Flour Hour
2000 California Screamin2002 20th Century Masters: The Best of the Dixie Dregs''
2007 "Live at the Montreux Jazz Festival 1978" - DVD release

With Others
1984 T Lavitz - Solo - Landslide Records
1984 Timmy - The Atlanta Project (4 Song EP) - Produced by Eddie Offord - Rudolf Music
1985 Vinnie Moore - Minds Eye - Shrapnel Records
1985 Steve Morse Band - High Tension Wires (1 cut, Leprechaun Promenade - originally done as part of a promo for Ensoniq).
1986 Crazy Backwards Alphabet - SST Records
1986 Henry Kaiser (Those who know History are Doomed to Repeat it) - SST Records
1994 John French - Waiting on the Flame - Demon Records
1995 Paul Barrere - If the Phone Don't Ring (recorded 1983) - Zoo/BMG
1987 Joaquin Lievano - One Mind (1 cut, An Uncommonly Fine Life) Global Pacific Records.
1995 The Mistakes  - (with Mike Keneally, Henry Kaiser, Prairie Prince) - Immune Records.
2001 Andy West - Rama 1 - with Mike Portnoy,  Mike Keneally, Rod Morgenstein, Toshi Iseda, Jonathan Mover, T Lavitz, Kit Watkins, and Jens Johansson - Magna Carta Records
2003 fwap

References

1953 births
Living people
Dixie Dregs members
Academy of Richmond County alumni
20th-century American bass guitarists
Magna Carta Records artists